This is a list of flags used in Azerbaijan, both today and in the past.

National flag

Governmental flags

Azerbaijani Armed Forces

Azerbaijani Land Forces

Azerbaijani Navy

Azerbaijani Air Force

Border Service of Azerbaijan

Internal Troops of Azerbaijan

Political flags

Ethnic groups flags

Historical flags

Azerbaijanis in other countries

References

Flags
Azerbaijan
List